Lucas Felipe Calegari (born 27 February 2002) is a Brazilian footballer who plays for Major League Soccer club LA Galaxy on loan from Fluminense as a right back.

Playing career
Calegari began playing football locally at the age of 7, and started as a forward with Uirapuru. Calegari joined the youth a academy of Fluminense at the age of 12, and signed his first contract with them in December 2019. Calegari made his professional debut with Fluminense in a 1-0 Campeonato Brasileiro Série A win over Athletico Paranaense on 22 August 2020.

International career
Calegari represented the Brazil U17s once in a 4–1 friendly win over the Paraguay U17s on 26 July 2019.

References

External links
Fluminense profile 

2002 births
Living people
People from Cuiabá
Brazilian footballers
Brazil youth international footballers
Association football fullbacks
Campeonato Brasileiro Série A players
Fluminense FC players
Major League Soccer players
LA Galaxy players
Sportspeople from Mato Grosso